Streptoglossa adscendens, commonly known as desert daisy, is a species of flowering plant in the family Asteraceae and grows in all mainland states of Australia with the exception of Victoria. It is a ground cover, upright or ascending perennial or annual herb with purple or pink flowers.

Description

Taxonomy and naming
Streptoglossa adscendens was first described George Bentham in Flora Australiensis as Pterigeron adscendens. In 1981 Clyde Robert Dunlop changed the name to Streptoglossa adscendens and the description was published in  Journal of the Adelaide Botanic Garden. The specific epithet (adscendens)  means "ascending".

Distribution and habitat
Desert daisy grows in a variety of habitats including granite hills and the edges of salt lakes in rocky, clay soils in all Australian mainland states other than Victoria.

References

Asterales of Australia
Flora of the Northern Territory
Flora of South Australia
Flora of Western Australia
Flora of Queensland
adscendens